Robin Haase was the defending champion, but decided not to participate.
Pablo Carreño-Busta won the title, defeating Andreas Beck 6–4, 7–6(7–4) in the final.

Seeds

Draw

Finals

Top half

Bottom half

References
 Main Draw
 Qualifying Draw

Citta di Como Challenger - Singles
Città di Como Challenger